F.C. Rishon LeZion , is an Israeli football club based in Rishon LeZion. The club is currently in Liga Gimel Central division.

History
The club was founded in 2007 and joined Liga Gimel Central division, where they play ever since, usually finishing at the bottom of the table. The club's best placing came in 2009–10, when it finished 8th in the league.

In the cup, the club had never made it past the fourth round, which is its best achievement, having lost in the fourth round, which also serves as the division league cup final, in 2009–10 to Bnei Yeechalal Rehovot.

References

External links
F.C. Rishon LeZion Israel Football Association 

Football clubs in Israel
Sport in Rishon LeZion
Association football clubs established in 2007
2007 establishments in Israel